Thierry Deuve (born 29 August 1956) is a French entomologist.

The moth Deuveia banghaasi is named for Deuve.

Works 
 1988 – Etudes morphologiques et phylogénétiques sur l'abdomen et les genitalia ectodermiques femelles des Coléoptères Adephaga 
 1991 – La nomenclature taxonomique du genre Carabus
 1993 – L'abdomen et les genitalia des femelles de coléoptères Adephaga
 1994 – Une classification du genre Carabus
 1997 – Catalogue des Carabini et Cychrini de Chine
 2001 [editor] – Origin of the Hexapoda
 2004 – Illustrated catalogue of the genus Carabus of the world (Coleoptera, Carabidae)
 2010 – Liste Blumenthal 2010: liste des taxons valides du genre Carabus
 2013 – Cychrus, Calosoma et Carabus de Chine
 2021 - Carabus of the World

References

French entomologists
1956 births
Living people
National Museum of Natural History (France) people